In algebraic geometry,  Du Bois singularities are singularities of complex varieties studied by . 

 gave the following characterisation of Du Bois singularities. Suppose that  is a reduced closed subscheme of a smooth scheme .

Then  has Du Bois singularities if and only if the induced map  is a quasi-isomorphism.

References

Singularity theory
Algebraic geometry